Axle Whitehead (born 16 December 1980) is an Australian TV host, singer, musician, and actor. He was a host on Video Hits. In 2008, he released his first studio album Losing Sleep which debuted outside the ARIA top 50. He also played Liam Murphy in Channel Seven's Home and Away and was the host of The World's Strictest Parents. In 2015, Whitehead began playing the role of Davis, a musician, in the Showtime series, Shameless. He formerly hosted game show The Wall.

Career

Music
In 1999 Whitehead was accepted into the Victorian College of the Arts to study Jazz Improvisation, then toured Australia and China with various bands. He was originally a contestant on the first series of Australian Idol in 2003. He failed to win the competition but made it into the top twenty. After being spotted on Idol, he was hired to host the television music show, Video Hits on Network Ten, hosting from 2004 to 1 November 2006. He traveled the world interviewing artists such as Beyonce, Justin Timberlake, Oasis and Duran Duran. In October 2006, Whitehead was sacked as TV presenter of Video Hits after exposing himself on stage during the ARIA Music Awards.

Whitehead's debut single "I Don't Do Surprises" was released on radio during January 2008, debuting at No. 8 on the ARIA Charts in Australia on 17 March 2008. It also received airplay on Nova radio and surfaced on TV advertisements for popular Channel 10 shows House and Women's Murder Club, and Channel 7's Home and Away, being described as a cross between Coldplay and Robbie Williams. His debut album, Losing Sleep was mixed by UK mixer, David Treahearn and released through Roadshow Music on 22 August 2008. Whitehead made his return to Video Hits on 24 February 2008, and to Australian Idol on 5 September 2008, though only as a guest to promote his debut album. The third single off Losing Sleep, Satellite has received significant play on Channel V and Video Hits.

Whitehead has also become the face of upmarket clothing brand 'Marcs'. His image has appeared on buses and print advertisements for the summer/autumn campaign.

Acting
Whitehead's first acting roles were minor parts in the television series The Secret Life of Us, and the 2003 film, Ned Kelly. After taking acting lessons for eighteen months, Whitehead auditioned for a role in Home and Away, which he described as "such a great place to learn and hone your skills". He joined the cast for fifteen episodes as rocker Liam Murphy, and later signed to be a regular cast member. Whitehead based his portrayal of the rocker on experiences of close friends, and said "you have to find a balance between putting yourself into it and not being too cheeky."

Whitehead hosted Seven Network's The World's Strictest Parents. In 2010, Whitehead was short-listed to host The X Factor Australia, but lost out to fellow Home and Away colleague Luke Jacobz.

Whitehead departed Home and Away in late 2012 to expand his acting career. He filmed his final scenes along with colleague Luke Mitchell (Romeo Smith). Whitehead moved to Los Angeles. After 18 months as an out of work actor, he landed a role in season 5 of the series Shameless. He played an Australian rock singer named Davis, a love interest of Fiona Gallagher (Emmy Rossum). He appeared in the first 4 episodes of season 5 and a brief appearance in episode 8.

In 2014, Whitehead was the runner-up for the Heath Ledger scholarship. In 2016, he played James Slade / Hellfire, a recurring role in Agents of S.H.I.E.L.D.. This role reunited him with Home and Away star Luke Mitchell.

In 2017, Whitehead began hosting Australian game show The Wall, which is based on the U.S. show of the same name. From 24 January 2020, Whitehead played the guest role of Zenin Alexio in Neighbours.

In 2021, Whitehead appeared on season three of The Masked Singer Australia making it to the Grand Finale and finishing in third place as "Mullet".

Cleo Bachelor of the Year
On 22 April 2009, Whitehead was announced Cleo Bachelor of the Year, beating competition from sportsmen, actors and other personalities. Sarah Oakes, Cleo Editor-in-chief denied the claims that Whitehead won as a direct result of a self-marketing ploy; "[He] is that perfect combination of good looks, charm, charisma and the kind of guy you'd be really happy to take home and introduce to your mum."

Discography

Whitehead rose to prominence after competing in the third round on the first season of Australian Idol in 2003. His debut extended play, The Axle Whitehead Band, was released as a collaboration in 2003 with jazz fusion band, the Axle Whitehead Band (feat. Steve Sedergreen, piano & keys). The release failed to rank on national charts. Whitehead released his debut studio album, Losing Sleep, in 2008 on Roadshow Music. The album peaked at number 68 on the Australian Top 100 Albums Chart. The lead single "I Don't Do Surprises" debuted at number eight on the Australian Top 100 Singles Chart and received gold certification by the Australian Recording Industry Association. The album's subsequent singles "Anywhere" and "Satellite" did not make the top 50.

Studio albums

Extended plays

Singles

Music videos

Guest appearances

Filmography

Film

Television

References

External links
 
 Axle Whitehead's Official MySpace

1980 births
Australian Idol participants
Australian game show hosts
Australian male television actors
Australian alternative rock musicians
Living people
21st-century Australian singers
21st-century Australian male singers